Louis Mellis is a Scottish actor and screenwriter. Along with David Scinto, he wrote the screenplay for the films Sexy Beast (2000) and 44 Inch Chest (2009).

In 2010, Mellis signed on to write The Princess' Gangster, based on the "true story" of Princess Margaret's affair with gangster John Bindon in the late 1960s.

Among gamers he is known for having voiced Darth Sion, a character in Star Wars: Knights of the Old Republic II: The Sith Lords.

Filmography
44 Inch Chest (2009)
Celebrity Shark Bait (2005) (TV) .... Narrator
Sexy Beast (2000)
Gangster No. 1 (2000)
Star Wars: Knights of the Old Republic II: The Sith Lords (2004) (VG) (voice) .... Darth Sion/Additional Voices
Mulberry - "The Art Class" (1993) TV Episode .... Football Referee
The Grass Arena (1991) .... Jock
Nuns on the Run (1990) .... Bank Security Guard
The Bill - "Don't Like Mondays" (1989) TV Episode .... Davies
Hawks (1988) .... Bouncers and Clients
Vroom (1988) .... Flanny
Pump Up the Volume: The History of House (2001) .... Narrator

References

External links

Scottish male voice actors
Living people
Year of birth missing (living people)
Scottish male film actors